The Lawnside School District is a community public school district that serves students in pre-kindergarten through eighth grade from Lawnside, in Camden County, New Jersey, United States.

As of the 2018–19 school year, the district, comprising one school, had an enrollment of 321 students and 31.0 classroom teachers (on an FTE basis), for a student–teacher ratio of 10.4:1.

The district is classified by the New Jersey Department of Education as being in District Factor Group "B", the second-lowest of eight groupings. District Factor Groups organize districts statewide to allow comparison by common socioeconomic characteristics of the local districts. From lowest socioeconomic status to highest, the categories are A, B, CD, DE, FG, GH, I and J.

For ninth through twelfth grades, public school students attend Haddon Heights High School, which serves Haddon Heights, and students from the neighboring communities of Barrington and Lawnside who attend the high school as part of sending/receiving relationships with the Haddon Heights School District. As of the 2018–19 school year, the high school had an enrollment of 906 students and 77.5 classroom teachers (on an FTE basis), for a student–teacher ratio of 11.7:1.

School

Lawnside Public School served an enrollment of 311 students in the 2018–19 school year.

Administration
Core members of the district's administration are:
Dr. Ronn H. Johnson, Superintendent
Dawn Leary, Business Administrator / Board Secretary

Board of education
The district's board of education, with nine members, sets policy and oversees the fiscal and educational operation of the district through its administration. As a Type II school district, the board's trustees are elected directly by voters to serve three-year terms of office on a staggered basis, with three seats up for election each year held (since 2012) as part of the November general election.

References

External links
Lawnside School District
 
School Data for the Lawnside School District, National Center for Education Statistics

Lawnside, New Jersey
New Jersey District Factor Group B
School districts in Camden County, New Jersey